The Lotus 87 was a Formula One racing car used by Team Lotus in the second part of the 1981 Formula One season and in the first race of the 1982 season.

Design and development  
The car, driven by Italian Elio de Angelis and future world champion Nigel Mansell, was another step in Lotus' development of ground effect cars. Its predecessor, the Lotus 81 had proven to suffer from a chassis that was not rigid enough, compared to the dominant Williams FW07. Lotus therefore introduced a new chassis, built out of carbon fibre and reinforced by  kevlar sheets, since the team felt carbon fibre alone would not be sufficient to provide the chassis with the stability needed. As the John Barnard-designed McLaren MP4/1 would prove, this was a miscalculation. 

The chassis was originally planned for the ambitious twin-chassis Lotus 88, but after the car was outlawed, it was hastily rebuilt to become the more conservative 87.

Racing history 
The car was not competitive enough to fight for victories, even though the drivers did manage to get some points. 

When the new turbo charged engines of Renault and Ferrari became more reliable, the car proved to be yet still too heavy and was replaced by a lighter 87B specification for the opening round of 1982. It was subsequently replaced altogether by the Lotus 91, which proved more competitive, recording a podium in its first outing in Brazil.

Formula One World Championship results
(key) 

* Of these, 13 points were scored with the 87. During the season Lotus switched from Michelin to Goodyear tyres.
** No points scored with the 87B.

References 

87